Tramea transmarina, known as the red glider or northern glider, is a species of dragonfly in the Libellulidae family. The type locality for Tramea transmarina is Fiji, but subspecies are found in the islands of the Pacific, north-eastern Australia and Southeast Asia.

Taxonomy
The following names are considered to be alternative names to Tramea transmarina :
 Trapezostigma euryale Selys, 1878
 Tramea transmarina intersecta Lieftinck, 1975
 Tramea propinqua Lieftinck, 1942
 Tramea samoensis Brauer, 1867

Description
Tramea members typically have coloured bases to their hindwings. When they fly, this creates the impression of them carrying bags at the top of the abdomen; hence they are commonly known as saddlebags gliders. In general, adult males have a dark thorax and bright abdomen.

Wings

References

Libellulidae
Odonata of Oceania
Odonata of Asia
Odonata of Australia
Insects of Southeast Asia
Insects of New Guinea
Taxa named by Friedrich Moritz Brauer
Insects described in 1867